The Atlantic Beach Bridge is a  long toll drawbridge carrying NY 878, connecting Lawrence and Atlantic Beach (Park Street), New York, while passing over the west end of Reynolds Channel. The bridge also provides direct access to the Rockaway Peninsula via Seagirt Boulevard. The original bridge opened in 1927, and the current bridge opened in 1952 and was rehabilitated in 1998.

Typically, the toll is $3.00 (USD) for vehicles under 5 tons (10,000 lb) in each direction as of January 1, 2023. Vehicles over 5 tons are $2 per axle. E-ZPass is currently not accepted, but it will add EZ-Pass in mid-2023 as part of the toll plaza refurbishment. An annual decal is $199 USD annually for Nassau County residents and $349 USD annually for non-resident passenger vehicles.  A 20-trip card for passenger vehicles can be purchased at a cash toll booth for $30.

The bridge is managed by the Nassau County Bridge Authority. The Nassau County Bridge Authority manages only one bridge.

History 

The original bridge opened on June 29, 1927, and had a vertical clearance of only . The bridge reduced travel time to Atlantic Beach by 30 minutes. Traffic bottlenecked as populations grew on both sides of the bridge in the 1940s. On October 14, 1950, Governor Thomas E. Dewey drove the first pile for the new Atlantic Beach Bridge. To accommodate the new six-lane span, Nassau County and New York City spent $2.5 million for approach road rights-of-way. The new Atlantic Beach Bridge, designed by Hardesty & Hanover, opened to traffic on May 10, 1952, at a cost of $9.5 million. Soon after the new span opened, the old bridge was demolished.

In 1998, a $19 million project was begun to bring the bridge up to federal standards. It involved the reconstruction of the approaching roadways and replacement of the existing concrete bridge deck. The project was completed in November 2000.

There have been allegations of patronage since the inception of the Nassau County Bridge Authority, which was created by the New York Legislature in 1945 to manage the bridge. Though the construction costs of the bridge have long since been paid off, the tolls remain. A 1999 audit of the agency by New York State Comptroller Carl McCall found many instances of patronage and mismanagement. The authority failed to seek competitive work for engineering work. In 1997, 71% of the bridge's budget was spent on personnel. The authority and local communities continue to resist toll conversion to E-ZPass.  One community leader believes the resistance is not based on costs but because this would necessitate accounting of toll monies.

Toll collection was temporarily suspended in mid-March 2020 due to the COVID-19 pandemic in New York. Tolls were reinstated at the beginning of June 2020.

See also 

 Bayville Bridge – Another drawbridge in Nassau County.

References

External links

Article on NYCRoads.com

Toll bridges in New York (state)
Bridges completed in 1927
Bridges completed in 1952
Bascule bridges in the United States
Bridges in Nassau County, New York
Road bridges in New York (state)
Steel bridges in the United States
Girder bridges in the United States
Transportation buildings and structures in Nassau County, New York